Omega Graduate School (formerly Oxford Graduate School) is a private graduate school in Dayton, Tennessee. Founded in 1980, the school focuses on integrating faith with traditional educational and professional disciplines. Omega Graduate School is accredited by the Transnational Association of Christian Colleges and Schools (TRACS). Though faculty are primarily Christian in their orientation, OGS describes itself as "non-sectarian, non-profit, and non-discriminatory".

The student body consists of approximately 100 students with a median age of 49 years.  The graduate school has 15 faculty members.

Academics

The graduate school is not a traditional seminary, but offers degrees in which students are encouraged to incorporate the principles of their faith into their academic work and vocational practices by analyzing the nature and role of religious faith and experience in specific societal contexts. The intention is to establish a community of scholars united in their efforts to find practical solutions to social problems. The program teaches social science research that focuses on the family, community, and the church.

The social setting of Christianity is used as the primary context for research into religion. Other religious traditions may be studied to contrast their similarities and differences with Christianity while providing a perspective for comprehending the nature of religious experience in a particular society.

The goal is to combine the study of religion with the study of society to provide information for resolving social problems within the human community.

Doctor of Philosophy (DPhil)
Omega Graduate School offers a Doctor of Philosophy degree in the Integration of Religion and Society. The program consists of seven week-long intensive residencies on campus (called "Core" sessions), a required 10-day residency, is conducted every January at the Rewley House residential center, University of Oxford, the Bodleian Library for research (an annual tradition since 1981), and a required week-long residency at the Library of Congress in Washington, DC.  Between Core sessions, students interact with faculty through guided tutorial instruction where subjects are divided into 30-, 60-, 90-, and 120-day assignments.  Typical course requirements consist of eclectic reading and research, essays, and a "Core Content Comprehensive Review".  This process typically requires 2–3 years to complete.

The program also consists of a dissertation phase following doctoral candidacy, whereby the student begins the process of conducting original sociological research.  Successful completion of the dissertation leads to graduation.  This process typically requires an additional 2–3 years to complete.

Master of Letters (MLitt)
The Master of Letters (MLitt) degree is offered for Family Life Education and Organizational Leadership.  The degree requires 30 semester hours of course credit. Courses are offered three times yearly in a series of four one-week core sessions on campus.

Campus

The rural campus of 45 acres has seven buildings: the administration center and lecture hall, the Oxford Lodge dormitory, the Weir Memorial Chapel and Institute Centre, the William O. Green Study Centre (library) and Parks Hall, the Gathering Place (cafeteria), and two housing units (Alpha and Beta houses).

Adjacent to the campus is the Crystal Springs recreation complex. It includes an Olympic size swimming pool, driving range, bowling, and a skating rink. While there are several walking tracks in the area, students also have access to the recreation complex.

Expansion plans are in development for a new technology center in addition to the William O. Green Study Centre, The Lion and Eagle Refectory, along with the Campus Hospitality and Student Center.

References

External links
 Official website

Transnational Association of Christian Colleges and Schools
Nondenominational Christian universities and colleges
Education in Rhea County, Tennessee
Buildings and structures in Rhea County, Tennessee
1980 establishments in Tennessee